The 2012 National Conference League was the 27th season of the National Conference League, the top league for British amateur rugby league clubs, and was the first season that the league was played in the summer.

The league was expanded to four tiers for the first time, with the new Division Three largely consisting of teams from the former Rugby League Conference National Division.

Premier Division
The Premier Division featured three new clubs:
Oulton Raiders, promoted as champions from 2010–11 NCL Division One
Ince Rose Bridge, promoted from 2010–11 NCL Division One
Myton Warriors, promoted from 2010–11 NCL Division One

League table

Play-offs

Division One
Division One featured six new clubs:
Hunslet Warriors, promoted as champions from 2010–11 NCL Division Two
Castleford Lock Lane, promoted from 2010–11 NCL Division Two
Egremont Rangers, promoted from 2010–11 NCL Division Two
Bradford Dudley Hill, relegated from 2010–11 NCL Premier Division
Wigan St Judes, relegated from 2010–11 NCL Premier Division
York Acorn, relegated from 2010–11 NCL Premier Division

League table

Division Two
Division Two featured five new clubs:
 Normanton Knights, relegated from 2010–11 NCL Division One
 Askam, played in 2011 NCL transitional season
 Widnes West Bank, played in 2011 NCL transitional season
 Dewsbury Celtic, joined from Rugby League Conference National Division
 Featherstone Lions, joined from Rugby League Conference National Division

League table

Division Three
Of the ten clubs in the newly formed Division Three, seven joined from the former Rugby League Conference National Division and two teams were promoted from the RLC Premier Divisions (Bristol Sonics and St Albans Centurions). The tenth club, South Wales Hornets, were a newly founded team. The Grand Final winners were Hemel Stags, defeating Underbank Rangers 17–10.

At the end of the season, all clubs apart from Underbank Rangers and Coventry Bears withdrew from the league for various reasons:
 Hemel Stags, accepted into Championship One
 Bristol Sonics, St Albans Centurions and Nottingham Outlaws, joined newly formed Conference League South
 Bramley Buffaloes and Kippax Knights, applications rejected by NCL; joined Yorkshire Men's League
 Warrington Wizards, merged with Woolston Rovers
 South Wales Hornets, folded

League table

Play-offs

Cup results
Conference Challenge Trophy:

 Leigh Miners Rangers 32–24 Egremont Rangers

References 

National Conference League seasons
National Conference League